The Vision Factory (also known under the names SPC Vision, SPC Codim and SPC Group) was a Dutch developer of video games for the Philips CD-i.

The Vision Factory was originally a developer of business software named SPCC (allegedly an acronym for Sergeant Pepper's Computer Company). They impressed Philips with CD-i games with colorful sprites, like the shooter Alien Gate. The Vision Factory was the label under which the SPC games were released. Their most famous game is probably the puzzle game Dimo's Quest, that was originally developed by Boeder Games / Infernal Byte Systems for the Amiga and was ported by SPC to CD-i.

In 1996, Philips stopped supporting the CD-i, which meant the demise of the company. In 2002, SPC / The Vision Factory went bankrupt.

Games 
 Alien Gate (CD-i, 1993)
 Steel Machine (CD-i, 1993)
 Dimo's Quest (CD-i, 1994) (port of Amiga game originally developed by Boeder Games/Infernal Byte Systems)
 The Apprentice (CD-i, 1994)
 Philips Media Encyclopedia (CD-i, 1995) (exclusive for the Netherlands)
 Die CD-i mit der Maus: Auf dem Bauernhof (CD-i, 1995)  (exclusive for Germany)
 Het Staat in de Sterren (CD-i, 1996) (exclusive for the Netherlands)
 Lingo (CD-i, 1994 / Windows, 1997) (exclusive for the Netherlands)
 Sport Freaks (CD-i, 1996)
 Uncover featuring Tatjana (CD-i, Windows, 1996)
 Lucky Luke: The Video Game (CD-i, 1996)
 Accelerator, (CD-i, 1997)
 Golden Oldies I: Guardian & Invaders (CD-i, 1997)
 Golden Oldies II: Blockbuster & Bughunt (CD-i, 1997)
 Scramble (CD-i, prototype)
 Breaker (CD-i, prototype)
 The Apprentice 2: Marvin's Revenge (CD-i, cancelled)

Sexual speeches and others 

Colorful graphics are not the only characteristics of most of The Vision Factory's games. Some of their games either hint at or involve content of a sexual nature. In Lucky Luke: The Video Game, loading screens show women dancing in short skirts while Lucky Luke plays on the piano. In The Apprentice, entering a series of codes in the Game Over screen triggered hidden Game Over animations that were parodies of Mortal Kombat finishers, including 'Nudalities' which featured fully nude girls. In Uncover featuring Tatjana, puzzle pieces must be laid down to reveal a sexy picture of Tatjana Simic.

References

Defunct video game companies of the Netherlands
Video game companies established in 1993
Video game companies disestablished in 2002
1993 establishments in the Netherlands